Coleophora ortneri is a moth of the family Coleophoridae. It is found in southern Spain.

The wingspan is 14–15 mm.

The larvae feed on Atriplex glauca. They create a light brown spatulate leaf case of 8–9 mm long with a mouth angle of about 55°. Full-grown larvae can be found in the second half of May.

References

ortneri
Moths described in 1981
Moths of Europe